Jenő Balogh (14 May 1864 - 15 February 1953) was a Hungarian politician and jurist, who served as Minister of Justice between 1913 and 1917. After the fall of the second István Tisza cabinet (1917) he retired from the politics. He also served as General Secretary of the Hungarian Academy of Sciences from 1920 to 1935.

References
 Magyar Életrajzi Lexikon

1864 births
1953 deaths
People from Veszprém County
National Party of Work politicians
Justice ministers of Hungary
Members of the Diet of Hungary
Members of the Hungarian Academy of Sciences